Jewkes may refer to:

John Jewkes (disambiguation)
Rachel Jewkes, South African medical scientist and author, Unit Director of the Gender and Health Unit of the Medical Research Council
Elizabeth Jewkes, English politician, see Ellesmere Port and Neston Council election, 2007
Jewkes, character in Pamela, or Virtue Rewarded